Mezgebu is a surname. Notable people with the surname include:

Assefa Mezgebu (born 1978), Ethiopian long-distance runner
Ayele Mezgebu (born 1973), Ethiopian long-distance runner

Surnames of African origin